Sahasombhop Srisomvongse (formerly: Sombhop; สมภพ) is a late Thai boxing manager and promoter. He has a nickname "Big Ung" (บิ๊กอึ่ง).

Srisomvongse was born on March 31, 1939 in a Thai Chinese family in Bangkok's Pathum Wan neighbourhood.  He graduated from Vajiravudh College and graduated with a bachelor's degree in law from  Thammasat University. In 1967, he was the co-founder of Channel 7.

He started a promoter from as an assistant of famous and popular promoter Tiamboon "The Great Eagle" Inthrarabutr (Saensak Muangsurin's promoter) by regularly organized boxing match on Channel 7 in 1970. Srisomvingse also had his own boxing gym, named "Sor Chitalada" in Soi Saensuk, Rama IV Road, Khlong Toei District, on the plot of his own home.

In early the 1980s, he was the agent of the World Boxing Council (WBC) in Thailand. He was also the founder Asian Boxing Council (ABCO) and was voted the first president in 1985. He was a supporter of many Thai boxers to the WBC champion, started from Payao Poontarat (a bronze medalist in 1976 Summer Olympics) in 1983 with the fight against Rafael Orono, a title holder at Grand Jomtien Palace Hotel, Pattaya, Chonburi province. He was also a co-manager of many Thai boxers who have been champion of the world, viz Sot Chitalada, Samart Payakaroon, Napa Kiatwanchai, Muangchai Kittikasem,  Saman Sorjaturong, Sirimongkol Singwangcha, Chatchai Sasakul, Wandee Singwangcha, Veeraphol Sahaprom and Medgoen Singsurat. And there are a number of boxers who never been a world champion but has challenged the world championship or won a regional or international championship, such as Rocky Chitalada, Mai Thomburifarm, Asawin Sordusit, Saming Kiatpetch, Torsak Pongsupa, Pone Saengmorakot etc. By the way, most of his boxers were trained by English's Charles Atkinson.

In the fight between Humberto González and Saman Sorjaturong in mid-1995 at Great Western Forum, Inglewood, California. After ended the sixth round, he asked the referee Lou Filippo to add one more round. When Filippo considered the symptoms of Sorjaturong. Because Sorjaturong suffered since the first round and Filippo almost stopped the contest. As a result, Sorjaturong won TKO in the seventh round.

During his lifetime, he is the promoter of the boxing events  on Channel 7 every Wednesday at noon titled "Suek Daorung TV Si Jed Mung Champion Lok" (ศึกดาวรุ่งทีวีสี 7 มุ่งแชมเปี้ยนโลก; lit: "Channel 7's Rising Star to World Champion Battle") to create a Thai boxer to be the world champion.

He died suddenly of a heart attack during nighttime sleep on the night of December 28, 2000. His last job position was Channel 7's Special Event Manager. After he died all of his affairs were transferred to Pol. Gen. Kovid Bhakdibhumi.

References

Sahasombhop Srisomvongse
Sahasombhop Srisomvongse
Sahasombhop Srisomvongse
Boxing managers
Sahasombhop Srisomvongse
2000 deaths
1939 births
Sahasombhop Srisomvongse
Deaths from organ failure
Sahasombhop Srisomvongse

th:สหสมภพ ศรีสมวงศ์